Perne is a surname. Notable people with the surname include:

Andrew Perne ( 1519–1589), Vice-Chancellor of Cambridge University and dean of Ely
Andrew Perne (Puritan) (1596–1654), English clergyman of Puritan opinions
Ralph Perne (fl. 1555), English politician

See also
Pernes (disambiguation)
Pern